The comic strip switcheroo (also known as the Great Comics Switcheroonie or the Great April Fools' Day Comics Switcheroonie) was a massive practical joke in which several comic strip writers and artists (cartoonists), without the foreknowledge of their editors, traded strips for a day on April Fools' Day 1997. The Switcheroo was masterminded by comic strip creators Rick Kirkman and Jerry Scott, creators of the Baby Blues daily newspaper comic strip.

Overview
According to Brian Walker's book The Comics: Since 1945, forty-six syndicated artists participated. Some of these switches were one for one (Mike Peters trading with Lynn Johnston, Scott Adams with Bil Keane, Jeff MacNelly with Mort Walker, etc.), while several comics did a multiple swap (including a thirteen-way swap). Also, one artist (Kevin Fagan) just swapped hands for the day, while the writer & artist for Sally Forth swapped roles for the day. Charles M. Schulz (creator of Peanuts) and Patrick McDonnell (creator of Mutts) were slated to do each other's strips, but backed out because one of them didn't think it was a good idea. Each artist was permitted to do what they wanted.

The one-day experiment proved to be a success, garnering some publicity and being a harmless yet amusing prank played on the newspapers, the readers, and the comic syndicates.

While characters making guest appearances in other comic strips is not an unusual occurrence (Dan Piraro's Bizarro and Stephan Pastis' Pearls Before Swine do it often), this was the most ambitious in scale. As of 2005, the phenomenon persists in webcomics, where Internet cartoonists occasionally switch places with one another. Guest character tributes have also appeared since 1997, notably on May 27, 2000 and on October 30, 2005, both tributes to Charles M. Schulz and Peanuts.

Subsequent similar events
On April 1, 1998, Jimmy Johnson published an Arlo and Janis strip in which the first two panels were blank, with the last two panel having Arlo imply that they were going to swap with Dagwood but there was a misunderstanding.  

On April 1, 2001, a few years after the 1997 Switcheroo, Bill Amend (FoxTrot) made a Sunday strip in which Jason Fox, Andy Fox, Roger Fox, and Peter Fox exchanged looks. The referenced strips: Cathy, Hägar the Horrible, The Boondocks, Doonesbury, Baby Blues, and Calvin and Hobbes (which had ended roughly 15 months before the original Switcheroonie).

On April 1, 2005, Stephan Pastis of Pearls Before Swine, Bill Amend of FoxTrot, and Darby Conley of Get Fuzzy all ran extremely similar comic dialogue in their respective strips, but with their own core characters saying the lines.

On April 1, 2016, at least fifty webcomics, including Cyanide & Happiness, The Awkward Yeti, and Poorly Drawn Lines all ran the same comic dialogue in their respective strips, akin to April 1, 2005.

On April 1, 2021, Olivia Jaimes of Nancy and Steenz of Heart of the City swapped strips for the day.

Strips and creators involved
The comics of April 1, 1997, were swapped as follows:

13-way swap
Baby Blues was drawn by Stephen Bentley (Herb and Jamaal): The characters have the same skin color as Herb and Jamaal's stars.
Herb and Jamaal was drawn by Russel Myers (Broom-Hilda).
Broom-Hilda was drawn by Bud Grace (Ernie).
Ernie was drawn by J. C. Duffy (The Fusco Brothers).
The Fusco Brothers was drawn by Jerry Van Amerongen (Ballard Street).
Ballard Street was drawn by Mel Lazarus (Momma).
Momma was drawn by Jeff Millar and Bill Hinds (Tank McNamara): Marylou introduces Momma to Tank as her new boyfriend.
Tank McNamara was drawn by Chip Sansom (The Born Loser).
The Born Loser was drawn by Brian Crane (Pickles): Earl joins Thorney on a walk through a neighborhood.
Pickles was drawn by Michael Jantze (The Norm): Earl is really Norm in a costume.
The Norm was drawn by Bill Holbrook (On the Fastrack): Wendy is at Norm's workplace.
On the Fastrack was drawn by Jim Toomey (Sherman's Lagoon): Just when you think Sherman makes a cameo, it's Wendy's hair.
Sherman's Lagoon was drawn by Kirkman and Scott (Baby Blues): Fish versions of the MacPhersons visit Sherman & Megan.

11-way swap
9 Chickweed Lane was drawn by Chris Browne (Hägar the Horrible): Lucky Eddie was one of Amos' Ancestors.
Hägar the Horrible was drawn by Wiley Miller (Non Sequitur): Hägar is visited by a systems analyst.
Non Sequitur was drawn by Robb Armstrong (Jump Start).
Jump Start was drawn by Walker and Browne (Hi and Lois): Joe and Marcy see themselves like Hi and Lois.
Hi and Lois was drawn by Greg Evans (Luann): Luann is Trixie's babysitter.
Luann was drawn by Dan Piraro (Bizarro): Luann sees a cartoon chihuahua named Squeeky in her mirror. The shock slowly turns her into a bug.
Bizarro was drawn by Bill Griffith (Zippy the Pinhead): One of the women shown is played by Zippy.
Zippy the Pinhead was drawn by Bill Amend (FoxTrot): Zippy and Griffy have Jason and Peter's respective faces and are accompanied by Quincy the Iguana.
FoxTrot was drawn by Brad and Guy Gilchrist (Nancy): Jason (as Luke Skywalker) is fighting Darth Vader who reveals himself to be Nancy.
Nancy was drawn by Pat Brady (Rose Is Rose): The animals Nancy performs for make the same happy expressions as Rose is Rose's characters.
Rose Is Rose was drawn by Brooke McEldowney (9 Chickweed Lane).

9-way swap
Beattie Blvd. was drawn by Ted Martin (Pavlov).
Pavlov was drawn by Vic Lee (I Need Help).
I Need Help was drawn by Lincoln Peirce (Big Nate).
Big Nate was drawn by Scott Stantis (The Buckets).
The Buckets was drawn by Jan Eliot (Stone Soup).
Stone Soup was drawn by Glenn McCoy (The Duplex): Val and Joan discuss their comic being drawn by a man instead of the usual woman.
The Duplex was drawn by Delainey and Rasmussen (Betty).
Betty was drawn by Dave Whamond (Reality Check).
Reality Check was drawn by Bruce Beattie (Beattie Blvd).

2-way swaps
Barney Google and Snuffy Smith was drawn by Hank Ketcham (Dennis the Menace): Dennis helps Jughaid with a "kick me" sign. Plus, Elviney and Lowezey resemble Alice and Mrs. Wilson.
Dennis the Menace was drawn by Fred Lasswell (Barney Google and Snuffy Smith): Dennis' characters dress like Snuffy Smith's for a group photo.
Beetle Bailey was drawn by Jeff MacNelly (Shoe): Skyler got stuck at Camp Swampy.
Shoe was drawn by Mort Walker (Beetle Bailey): Shoe beats up Cosmo like Sgt. Snorkel would Beetle.
Blondie was drawn by Jim Davis (Garfield): Garfield steals one of Dagwood Bumstead's famous sandwiches.
Garfield was drawn by Young and Drake (Blondie): Jon and Garfield stay with the Bumsteads while their paint dries.
Dilbert was drawn by Bil Keane (Family Circus): Billy visits Dilbert's cubicle.
Family Circus was drawn by Scott Adams (Dilbert): Thel sports a PHB-esque hairdo and Dogbert is her consultant.
For Better or For Worse was drawn by Mike Peters (Mother Goose and Grimm): John and Elly Patterson got 'stuck' with dialogue balloons of the characters of Mother Goose and Grimm.
Mother Goose and Grimm was drawn by Lynn Johnston (For Better or For Worse): Edgar sneaks away to hang with the Mother Goose & Grimm cast.
One Big Happy was drawn by Dave Coverly (Speed Bump).
Speed Bump was drawn by Rick Detorie (One Big Happy): Ruthie and her family are in the background.

Other notes:
Kevin Fagan drew his creation Drabble using his left hand instead of his right.
The artist and writer behind Sally Forth switched roles for a day.

See also
Détournement
Swipe (comics)

References

Further reading

External links
 
  List of webcomics participating in the April 1, 2016 switcheroo.

April Fools' Day jokes

Crossover comics
1997 in comics
Comics terminology